Aidan Browne (b. Belfast) is a Northern Irish television presenter and actor.

Broadcasting career
Browne has been a freelance continuity announcer and newsreader at UTV since 1993. He also contributes regularly to Ivan Martin's Sunday Brunch programme on U105 discussing television programmes for the week ahead.

Personal life
As well as his announcing role, Browne is a senior lecturer in Performing Arts at the Belfast Metropolitan College (formerly the Belfast Institute of Further and Higher Education).  He is also involved with Youth Lyric; as a tutor since 1986 and as Director of the group since 1993.

Browne previously studied at Lancaster University, the University of Ulster, the Guildhall School of Music and Drama and the London Academy of Music and Dramatic Art.  He is married with two children.

References

External links
Aidan Browne's profile on the Youth Lyric website

Living people
Year of birth missing (living people)
Alumni of Lancaster University
Alumni of Ulster University
Television presenters from Northern Ireland
Male actors from Northern Ireland
Male actors from Belfast
Radio and television announcers
UTV (TV channel)
Alumni of the Guildhall School of Music and Drama